The 2007–08 PFF League was the 4th season of PFF League, second tier of Pakistan Football Federation. The season started on 7 November 2007 concluded on 30 January 2008. Pak Electron were declared the champions, and gained promotion to the 2008–09 Pakistan Premier League along with the second-placed Pakistan Steel.

Format 
Fifteen teams competed in the tournament. However, Sindh Government Press withdrew before the tournament started. In the group stage, teams were divided into two groups of seven teams each, playing each other in a round-robin format. Top three teams from each group progressed to the Super Six stage, where they had to play against each other in another round-robin league. Top two teams from the Super Six stage were promoted to the 2008–09 Pakistan Premier League, with the top team being declared as the PFF League champion.

Groups

Group A

Group B

Super Six

Notes

References 

Pakistan Football Federation League seasons
PFF
Pakistan